Sébastien Thibault (born 25 July 1970 in Beaupréau) is a retired French athlete who specialised in the sprint hurdles. He represented his country at the 1992 Summer Olympics, as well as two outdoor and three indoor World Championships.

His personal bests are 13.45 seconds in the 110 metres hurdles (+1.7 m/s, Narbonne 1992) and 7.65 seconds in the 60 metres hurdles (Valencia 1998).

Competition record

References

1970 births
Living people
French male hurdlers
Athletes (track and field) at the 1992 Summer Olympics
Olympic athletes of France
Sportspeople from Maine-et-Loire
Athletes (track and field) at the 1997 Mediterranean Games
Mediterranean Games competitors for France